Yordan Gospodinov (born 15 June 1978) is a former Bulgarian footballer who played as a goalkeeper.

He had previously played for Neftochimic Burgas, Litex Lovech, Slavia Sofia, Greek Panserraikos FC, Kaliakra Kavarna, Romanian Concordia Chiajna and Lokomotiv Plovdiv.

External links

 Profile at LevskiSofia.info

1978 births
Living people
Bulgarian footballers
Bulgarian expatriate footballers
Association football goalkeepers
First Professional Football League (Bulgaria) players
Liga I players
Neftochimic Burgas players
PFC Litex Lovech players
PFC Slavia Sofia players
Panserraikos F.C. players
PFC Lokomotiv Mezdra players
PFC Levski Sofia players
PFC Kaliakra Kavarna players
CS Concordia Chiajna players
PFC Lokomotiv Plovdiv players
Expatriate footballers in Greece
Expatriate footballers in Romania
Sportspeople from Sliven
Bulgaria international footballers